Anthony Douglas (Tony) Toft PRCPE CBE LVO (29 October 1944-) is a 20th-century Scottish physician, specialising in endocrinology and thyroid disease. He served as President of the Royal College of Physicians of Edinburgh from 1991 to 1994.

Life
Toft was born on 29 October 1944, the son of  Anne Laing and William Vincent Toft. He was educated at Perth Academy.

He moved to the South Side in Edinburgh in 1962 when he began his studies in medicine at the University of Edinburgh. He graduated with an MB ChB  in 1969 and then, after practical training in Edinburgh hospitals, practised as a general practitioner on Islay and then Orkney. In 1971 he became a Ciba Research Fellow in Endocrinology.

From 1978 he was Consultant Physician at the Edinburgh Royal Infirmary.

In 1991 he succeeded John Richmond as President of the Royal College of Physicians of Edinburgh and was succeeded in turn by John D. Cash in 1994. He was created a Commander of the Order of the British Empire by Queen Elizabeth II in 1995. He was President of the British Thyroid Association from 1996 to 2009.

He retired from the NHS in 2009 and was awarded the Royal Victorian Order (LVO) in the same year.

Publications
Understanding Thyroid Disorders
Thyroid Hormone Replacement (2017)

Artistic recognition
His portrait by Alexander Fraser (born 1950) is held by the Royal College of Physicians of Edinburgh.

References

Year of birth missing (living people)
Living people
People educated at Perth Academy
Alumni of the University of Edinburgh
20th-century Scottish medical doctors
British endocrinologists
Presidents of the Royal College of Physicians of Edinburgh